The 2022 Sydney to Hobart Yacht Race, sponsored by Rolex and hosted by the Cruising Yacht Club of Australia in Sydney, was the 77th annual running of the Sydney to Hobart Yacht Race. It began on Sydney Harbour at 1 pm on Boxing Day (26 December 2022), before heading south for  through the Tasman Sea, Bass Strait, Storm Bay and up the River Derwent, to cross the finish line in Hobart, Tasmania.

A fleet of 109 boats contested the race and 100 finished. Line honours were claimed by Andoo Comanche in a time of 1 day, 11 hours, 56 minutes and 48 seconds. Celestial (Sam Haynes) won the Tattersall Cup.

Results

Line honours (Top 10)

Handicap results (Top 10)

References

Sydney to Hobart Yacht Race
Sydney
Sydney
December 2022 sports events in Australia